NIA, Nia, or nia may refer to:

 National Investigation Agency (NIA), Federal Investigative Agency in india 
 Nia (given name), including a list of people and fictional characters
 Nia (fitness), a type of aerobic exercise
 Nia (fungus), a genus of marine fungi
 SS Nia, a French steamship in service 1952–54
 Nia, a principle of Kwanza
 Nia (album), a music album by Blackalicious
 Project NIA, an American organization supporting youth in trouble with the law
 ICAO designator of Nile Air, an Egyptian airline
 IATA code of Nimba Airport, Nimba, Liberia
 nia, ISO 639-2 and -3 codes for the Nias language

Acronyms
 National Intelligence Agency, former name of the State Intelligence Services (the Gambia) 
 Nanotechnology Industries Association, an international association of nanotechnology companies
National Immigration Administration, an agency under the Ministry of Public Security in the People's Republic of China
 National Immigration Agency, an agency under the Ministry of the Interior in the Republic of China (Taiwan)
 National Infrastructure Assessment, published by the UK National Infrastructure Commission
 National Indoor Arena, former name of an indoor arena in Birmingham, England, United Kingdom
 National Institute of Accountants, the former name until 2011 for the Institute of Public Accountants in Australia
 National Institute of Aerospace, an aerospace research institute in the United States
 National Institute on Aging, a health research institute in the United States
 National Institute of Ayurveda, apex training and research institute in Ayurveda in India
 National Insurance Academy (NIA Pune), an insurance educational institute in India
 National Intelligence Agency (disambiguation), various governmental organizations
 National Intelligence Authority, a United States government authority from 1946 to 1947
 National Investigation Agency, the counter-terrorism agency in India
 National Iraqi Alliance, a Shi'a Islamist electoral coalition in Iraq
 National Irrigation Administration, a Philippine government agency for irrigation development and management
 Nature Improvement Area, a UK landscape-scale nature conservation designation
 Net income attributable, a concept in the United States tax code related to Individual Retirement Accounts
 Net Internal Area, a methodology for measuring building areas for real estate
 Neural Impulse Actuator,  a peripheral for gaming on Windows computers
 Nigerian Institute of Architects, a professional association in Nigeria
 Noi Bai International Airport, Hanoi, Vietnam
 Northern Ireland Assembly, the legislature of Northern Ireland
 Nuclear Industry Association, the trade association for the UK's civil nuclear industry

See also
 NIAS (disambiguation)